Iberus alonensis is a species of gastropods belonging to the family Helicidae.

The species is found in Spain.

References

alonensis
Gastropods described in 1821